NORDUnet is an international collaboration between the National research and education networks in the Nordic countries.

Members 
The members of NORDUnet are:

 SUNET of Sweden
 UNINETT of Norway
 FUNET of Finland
 Forskningsnettet of Denmark
 RHnet of Iceland

Network

NORDUnet interconnects the Nordic national research and education networks and connects them to the worldwide network for research and education and to the general purpose Internet. NORDUnet provides its services by a combination of leased lines and Internet services provided by other international operators. NORDUnet has peering in multiple important internet exchange sites outside the Nordics, such as Amsterdam, Chicago, Frankfurt, London, Miami and New York.

In addition to the basic Internet service NORDUnet operates information services and provides USENET NetNews and Multicast connectivity to the Nordic national networks. NORDUnet also coordinates the national networks' Computer Emergency Response Team (CERT) activities and the Nordic national networks' IPv6 activities - an area where NORDUnet has been active for years.

NORDUnet is one of the members, alongside Internet2, ESnet, SURFnet, CANARIE and GÉANT, to pilot a 100G intercontinental connection between Europe and North America.

History
NORDUnet is the result of the NORDUNET programme (1986 to 1992) financed by the Nordic Council of Ministers, officially beginning operations 1989. It was the first European network to embrace the TCP/IP technology and to connect to the National Science Foundation Network in the United States providing open access for university students in member countries. NORDUnet has been called the driving force of bringing the TCP/IP based backbone technology to Europe (see Protocol Wars).

NORDUnet has only few permanent employees. Most of the work is contracted to appropriate organisations in the Nordic area.

Distinction
The web site for NORDUNet, nordu.net, is the oldest active domain name. It was registered on January 1, 1985.

See also
History of the Internet
 History of the Internet in Sweden
NORSAR – one of the two original international connections on the ARPANET
Norwegian Defence Research Establishment – carried out early research on TCP/IP in Europe along with Peter Kerstein's group at University College London and the Royal Signals Radar Establishment in Britain

References

External links
 NORDUnet website

Academic computer network organizations
Information technology organizations based in Europe
Internet in Denmark
Nordic organizations
1985 establishments in Europe
Organizations established in 1985